Steinburg – Dithmarschen Süd (English: Steinburg – Dithmarschen South) is an electoral constituency (German: Wahlkreis) represented in the Bundestag. It elects one member via first-past-the-post voting. Under the current constituency numbering system, it is designated as constituency 3. It is located in central western Schleswig-Holstein, comprising the Steinburg district, the southern part of the Dithmarschen district, and part of the Segeberg district.

Steinburg – Dithmarschen Süd was created for the 1965 federal election. Since 2017, it has been represented by Mark Helfrich of the Christian Democratic Union (CDU).

Geography
Steinburg – Dithmarschen Süd is located in central western Schleswig-Holstein. As of the 2021 federal election, it comprises the district of Steinburg, the southern part of the Dithmarschen district (specifically the urban municipality of Brunsbüttel, and the Ämter of Burg-Sankt Michaelisdonn, Marne-Nordsee, and Mitteldithmarschen), and the urban district of Bad Bramstedt and Amt of Bad Bramstedt-Land from the Segeberg district.

History
Steinburg – Dithmarschen Süd was created in 1965, then known as Steinburg – Süderdithmarschen. It contained parts of the abolished constituencies of Steinburg and Norder- und Süderdithmarschen. Until 1972, it was constituency 4 in the numbering system. From 1972 until 2002, its name contained a hyphen between "Dithmarschen" and "Süd".

In the elections of 1965 and 1969, Steinburg – Süderdithmarschen consisted of the districts of Steinburg and Süderdithmarschen. After reform of the administrative divisions in Schleswig-Holstein, the constituency acquired its current name and configuration, containing Steinburg and the southern part of Dithmarschen. In 2002, Bad Bramstedt and Bad Bramstedt-Land became part of Steinburg – Dithmarschen Süd.

Members
The constituency has been held by the Christian Democratic Union (CDU) during all but three Bundestag terms since its creation in 1965. Its first representative was the CDU's Kai-Uwe von Hassel, who served from 1965 until 1980, when the constituency was won by the Social Democratic Party (SPD). It was then represented by Kurt Leuschner for a single term, before returning to the CDU in 1983. Between then and 1998, it was represented by Dietrich Austermann. The constituency was won by the SPD's Cornelie Sonntag-Wolgast in 1998. She was re-elected in 2002, but the constituency again returned to the CDU in 2002. It was then represented by Rolf Koschorrek until 2013. He was succeeded by Mark Helfrich, who was re-elected in 2017 and 2021.

Election results

2021 election

2017 election

2013 election

2009 election

2005 election

Notes

References

Federal electoral districts in Schleswig-Holstein
1965 establishments in West Germany
Constituencies established in 1965